Hoplodoris nodulosa is a species of sea slug, a dorid nudibranch, a marine gastropod mollusc in the family Discodorididae''.

Distribution
This species is recorded from the West Pacific including Southern Australia from New South Wales to Western Australia and throughout New Zealand.

References

Discodorididae
Gastropods described in 1864